Ketto Dam  is a dam in Tsunan, Niigata Prefecture, Japan, near the village of Ketto. It was completed in 1972.

References 

Dams in Niigata Prefecture
Dams completed in 1972